Ruppia maritima is an aquatic plant species commonly known as beaked tasselweed, beaked ditchgrass, ditch grass, tassel pondweed and widgeon grass.  Despite its scientific name, it is not a marine plant; is perhaps best described as a salt-tolerant freshwater species. The generic name Ruppia was dedicated by Linnaeus to the German botanist Heinrich Bernhard Ruppius (1689-1719) and the specific name (maritima) translates to "of the sea".

Distribution
It can be found throughout the world, most often in coastal areas, where it grows in brackish water bodies, such as marshes. It is a dominant plant in a great many shoreline regions. It does not grow well in turbid water or low-oxygen substrates.

Description

Ruppia maritima is a thread-thin, grasslike annual or perennial herb which grows from a rhizome anchored shallowly in the wet substrate. It produces a long, narrow, straight or loosely coiled inflorescence tipped with two tiny flowers. The plant often self-pollinates, but the flowers also release pollen that reaches other plants as it floats away on bubbles.

The fruits are drupelets. They are dispersed in the water and inside the digestive system of fish and waterbirds that eat them. The plant also reproduces vegetatively by sprouting from its rhizome to form colonies.

Taxonomy and nomenclature
On the basis of molecular phylogenetic analyses, a species complex, named R. maritima complex, had been discerned, which was then extended to include eight lineages, or nine lineages.

A lectotype for R. cirrhosa is designated and the name is shown to be a homotypic synonym of R. maritima.

Wetlands and wildlife
This plant and the epiphytic algae attached to the floating leaves can be an important part of the diet for selected herbivorous waterfowl species, but not important for predatory waterfowl that eat fish or invertebrate animals. In many areas, wetlands restoration begins with the recovery and protection of this plant.

See also
Wetland indicator status
Wetland conservation
Wetland classification
Constructed wetland

References

External links

Jepson Manual Treatment - Ruppia maritima
Ruppia maritima - Photo gallery

maritima
Brackish water plants
Freshwater plants
Salt marsh plants
Flora of North America
Flora of South America
Flora of Africa
Flora of Asia
Flora of Europe
Bird food plants
Flora of Australia
Plants described in 1753
Taxa named by Carl Linnaeus